Caudillos de Chihuahua are an American football team based in Chihuahua City, Mexico. The Caudillos compete in the Liga de Fútbol Americano Profesional (LFA), the top American football league in Mexico. The team plays its home games at the Estadio Olímpico Universitario José Reyes Baeza.

History
The team was announced on 1 August 2019 by Jorge Ginther, team owner and president, as an expansion franchise of Fútbol Americano de México for the 2020 season. In the press conference Ginther also announce that the head coach would be Mauricio Balderrama and the team had no name yet, and it would be chosen by the fans by a Facebook poll.

On 9 August, the team announced that the name chosen by the fans was Caudillos de Chihuahua. Also, the team announced that the fans would choose the team colors and logo.

The first try out was in Chihuahua City and in the next months in the cities of Juárez in Chihuahua and El Paso in Texas. In November the team announced they would play his local games on the Estadio Olímpico Universitario José Reyes Baeza.

Balderrama era

2020 season 
The Caudillos played their first game on 22 February against the Tequileros de Jalisco as a local team with a 53–13 win. Then, the Caudillos won other three games before the season was cancelled due the COVID-19 pandemic in Mexico. The team had a perfect season with four victories against Tequileros, Rojos, Centauros and Bulldogs.

On 9 February 2022, head coach Mauricio Balderrama announced his resignation due to personal reasons.

Landeros era 
After Balderrama's resignation, the Caudillos announced that the new head couch for the 2022 season would be Federico Landeros Rodríguez.

2022 season 
The Caudillos began their season with a 28–9 loss to the Parrilleros de Monterrey. The next week, the Caudillos hosted the Pioneros de Querétaro in a 43–6 win.

In the several weeks, the Caudillos won another four games against Tequileros de Jalisco, Tiburones de Cancún, Jefes de Ciudad Juárez and Bulldogs de Naucalpan with a mark of 31–14, 62–0, 21-14 and 61-12 respectively. In the other hand, the team loss two games against Rojos CDMX and Los Cabos Marlins with a mark of 49-40 and 32–29.

The team qualified to the postseason and traveled to Monterrey to play against the Parrilleros, though they lost 27–23.

Change of league 
On 30 September 2022, the FAM League announced its dissolution and after that, the team announced his integration on the Liga de Fútbol Americano Profesional for the 2023 season as the eleventh team in the league.

Roster

Season-by-season

References

Liga de Fútbol Americano Profesional teams
Sports teams in Chihuahua City
American football teams established in 2019
2019 establishments in Mexico